The Heart of Madame Sabali is a 2015 tragicomic feature film by Canadian director Ryan McKenna. It stars Marie Brassard, Amadou & Mariam, Youssef Camara and Paul Ahmarani.

The film won the Focus Grand Prize for Canadian/Québec Film at the 2015 Festival de nouveau Cinéma.

Plot 
Jeannette (Brassard) is a white Québécois woman with a severe heart condition living in a suburb of Montreal. After undergoing transplant surgery where she receives the heart of a Malian woman named Madame Sabali, she begins to experience flashbacks of her donor's brutal murder. Soon thereafter, Jeannette becomes friends with Madame Sabali's son Chibale (Camara), who believes she is the reincarnation of his mother.

Response
The film won the Grand Prix Focus at the 2015 Festival du nouveau cinéma, and Brassard received a Vancouver Film Critics Circle nomination for Best Actress in a Canadian Film at the Vancouver Film Critics Circle Awards 2015.

References

External links

Tragicomedy films
2015 films
Films set in Montreal
Films shot in Montreal
Canadian black comedy films
French-language Canadian films
2010s Canadian films